Hajji Hasan (also Romanized as Ḩājjī Ḩasan) is a village in, and the capital of, Mokriyan-e Shomali Rural District of the Central District of Miandoab County, West Azerbaijan province, Iran. At the 2006 National Census, its population was 1,098 in 250 households. The following census in 2011 counted 1,215 people in 365 households. The latest census in 2016 showed a population of 1,323 people in 399 households; it was the largest village in its rural district.

References 

Miandoab County

Populated places in West Azerbaijan Province

Populated places in Miandoab County